The spotted rocksnail, scientific name Leptoxis picta, is a species of freshwater snail with a gill and an operculum, an aquatic gastropod mollusk in the family Pleuroceridae. This species is endemic to the United States.

References

Molluscs of the United States
Leptoxis
Gastropods described in 1834
Taxa named by Timothy Abbott Conrad
Taxonomy articles created by Polbot